The 2016 World Outdoor Bowls Championship men's singles  will be held at the Burnside Bowling Club in Avonhead, Christchurch, New Zealand from 6–11 December 2016.

Shannon McIlroy from New Zealand won the men's singles gold medal.

Section tables

Section 1

Section 2

Finals

Results

References

Men